Mass is a 2004 Indian Telugu-language action drama film written and directed by Raghava Lawrence in his directorial debut. Produced by Akkineni Nagarjuna under Annapurna Studios banner, it stars Akkineni Nagarjuna, Jyothika, Charmy Kaur, Raghuvaran and Rahul Dev. The music was composed by Devi Sri Prasad. The film was released on 23 December 2004 and was a blockbuster at the box office. It was the highest-grossing film in Nagarjuna's career at the time. The film was dubbed and released in Tamil as Veeran. In 2005, the film was dubbed in Hindi as Meri Jung - One Man Army and it was also re-dubbed in Hindi as Mass in 2022.

Plot 
Mass, an orphan, bonds well with his landlord's son Adi. He is in love with his colleague Anjali, who happens to be the daughter of Vizag city's gangster Satya. This restricts her from falling for him, as it would land him in danger, but she finally gives in after some time. Anjali suggests Mass tie the knot immediately before her brother Seshu and Satya tries separating them. Seshu and Satya kill Adi when he tries to stop them from separating the lead pair before marriage. Mass later moves into Vizag and stays in an apartment hiding his identity to take revenge on Satya and Seshu. Finally, Mass' quest for revenge is completed as he finally eliminates them.

Cast

 Akkineni Nagarjuna as Mass / Ganesh
 Jyothika as Anjali, Mass's love interest
 Charmy Kaur as Priya
 Raghuvaran as Satya, Anjali's father
 Rahul Dev as Seshu, Anjali's elder brother, the Don of Vizag
 Prakash Raj as Advocate Durga Prasad 
 Indukuri Sunil Varma as Aditya a.k.a. Adi, considering him as Mass's younger brother
 Dharmavarapu Subramanyam as Adi's father
 Manava Balayya as Anjali's Grandfather
 Jeeva as Police Officer
 Sameer as Police Officer
 Venu Madhav as a Beggar
 Narsing Yadav as Narsing
 Satyam Rajesh as Taxi driver
 Karuna as Sirisha
 Apoorva as Priya's mother
 Ravi Kale as ACP of Visakhapatnam 
 Varsha
 Ruthika 
 Raghava Lawrence in a special appearance in "Mass" song
 Tanu Roy in a special appearance in "Mass" song

Soundtrack

Music composed by Devi Sri Prasad and was released on ADITYA Music Company. The audio was released in an entertaining function held at Taramati Baradari (Golkonda).

Release
The film opened with 191 prints.

Awards and nominations

References

External links
 

2004 films
2000s Telugu-language films
Films scored by Devi Sri Prasad
Indian action films
2000s masala films
Indian films about revenge
2004 directorial debut films
2004 action films
Films directed by Raghava Lawrence